In the U.S. state of Wisconsin, the Central Plain is a geographical region consisting of about  of land in a v-shaped belt across the center of the state. Beginning in the west, the Central Plain originates in Burnett and Polk Counties and runs southeast to Columbia County, where it turns northeast and reaches its end in Marinette County.

There are variations on the flatland, however. This section of the region is primarily a hardwood forest of maple, birch, and aspen, but there are several areas of agriculture scattered across the area. The plain is occasionally broken by rolling hills throughout its western half. Plains which were once the bed of Glacial Lake Wisconsin dominate the south central part of the region. Farms, fields, and cranberry bogs cover the landscape, and sandstone buttes and mesas are not uncommon. The Wisconsin River dissects the plain here, creating the Wisconsin Dells. East of the river, moraines and small kettle lakes are interspersed throughout the plain. Forests and wetlands mark the northeastern section of the region.

For the most part, the Central Plain is a rural area of farmland and forests. Population is sparse. The city of Eau Claire, Wisconsin is located on the southern border of the plain’s northwest end, and is the region’s largest city with a population of 61,704. Other principal cities in the Central Plain region include Chippewa Falls and Menomonie in the northwest, as well as Stevens Point and Wisconsin Rapids along the Wisconsin River.

Counties in the Central Plain
Part or all of the land in the following counties is included in the Central Plains of Wisconsin:

References

Regions of Wisconsin